Lee Morgan Sextet (also known as Lee Morgan Volume 2: Sextet) is an album by jazz trumpeter Lee Morgan released on the Blue Note label in 1957.  It was recorded on December 2, 1956 and features performances by Morgan, Hank Mobley, Kenny Rodgers, Horace Silver, Paul Chambers and Charlie Persip. The Allmusic review by Scott Yanow calls the album "An above-average hard bop set".

Track listing 
 "Whisper Not" (Golson) - 7:20
 "Latin Hangover" (Golson, arr. Marshall) - 6:43
 "His Sister" (Marshall, arr. Golson) - 6:32
 "Slightly Hep" (Golson, arr. Marshall) - 6:27
 "Where Am I?" (Golson, arr. Marshall) - 5:49
 "D's Fink" (Marshall, arr. Golson) - 7:41

Personnel 
 Lee Morgan - trumpet
 Hank Mobley - tenor saxophone
 Kenny Rodgers - alto saxophone
 Horace Silver - piano
 Paul Chambers - bass
 Charlie Persip - drums
The album credits Benny Golson and Owen Marshall with "Compositions and Arrangements". Tracks 1, 2, 4, and 5 are composed by Golson, and 3 and 6 by Marshall.

References

Hard bop albums
Lee Morgan albums
1957 albums
Blue Note Records albums
Albums produced by Alfred Lion
Albums recorded at Van Gelder Studio